Yarla or Yarlangab (fl. late 3rd millennium BCE) was the 9th Gutian ruler of the Gutian Dynasty of Sumer mentioned on the "Sumerian King List" (SKL). Yarla was the successor of Ibate. Kurum then succeeded Yarla.

See also

 History of Sumer
 List of Mesopotamian dynasties

References

Gutian dynasty of Sumer